The Deadly Tower (also known as Sniper) is a 1975 American made-for-television action drama thriller film directed by Jerry Jameson. It stars Kurt Russell and Richard Yniguez and is based on the University of Texas tower shooting.

Plot
The film is based on the true story of Charles Joseph Whitman, an engineering student and former Marine who murdered his own wife and mother and then killed 14 more people and wounded 31 others in a shooting rampage at the University of Texas at Austin on the afternoon of August 1, 1966.

Cast

Production
The film was produced by Antonino Calderon, who was head of Image, an organization dedicated to providing more positive screen depictions of Mexican Americans. He met with Robert Howard, president of the NBC network and asked if he could make a film about an actual Chicano hero. Howard agreed. Calderon pitched several stories and Howard agreed to finance The Deadly Tower as it was about a Chicano police officer, Martinez. MGM were commissioned to make the movie with Calderon as producer, Richard Caffey as executive producer and David Goldsmith as production executive.

The Deadly Tower was filmed at the Louisiana State Capitol in Baton Rouge, Louisiana because the University of Texas refused to allow filming there.

Release

Lawsuits
In 1976 Martinez received an undisclosed out-of-court settlement after suing the producers of the Deadly Tower for negative and racist depictions of his wife,
portrayed in the movie as a nagging Hispanic woman; in fact she is a blonde, blue-eyed German.

In 1990, Houston McCoy, one of two policemen who took part in killing Whitman, sued Turner Broadcasting System (which held the ownership of most of MGM's pre-1986 works) for $14 million for emotional distress and damage to his reputation, claiming the film caused him to become an alcoholic and lose self-respect by depicting him as a coward.

Reception

Critical response
The Los Angeles Times called the film "highly effective" but wondered "no matter how well done is there any reason to relive that bloody moment of history."

References

External links
 
The Deadly Tower at BFI
The Deadly Tower at Letterbox DVD

1975 television films
1975 films
Crime films based on actual events
1975 crime films
American television films
Films directed by Jerry Jameson
Films scored by Don Ellis
Films set in Austin, Texas
Films set in 1966
University of Texas tower shooting